Pampa is a genus of birds in the hummingbird family Trochilidae. These species are resident in northern Middle America.

Species
The genus contains three species.
Curve-winged sabrewing, Pampa curvipennis
Wedge-tailed sabrewing, Pampa pampa  
Rufous sabrewing, Pampa rufa

These four species were formerly placed in the genus Campylopterus. A molecular phylogenetic study published in 2014 found that the genus Campylopterus was polyphyletic. In the revised classification to create monophyletic genera, these species were moved to the resurrected genus Pampa that had been introduced in 1854 by Ludwig Reichenbach.

References

Pampa (bird)
Bird genera